Miles Higson (born 27 March 1993) is an English actor, known for portraying the role of Seth Costello in the Channel 4 soap opera Hollyoaks from 2010 to 2011, and again from 2020 to 2021.

Career and life
He studied for his A-Levels at Bacup and Rawtenstall Grammar School where he also took his GCSEs. He also attended the Manchester School Of Acting. Before landing his role in Hollyoaks he appeared in a short film with All Seeing Eye Productions. Higson formerly lived with co-stars Claire Cooper and Emmett J. Scanlan, a (now) married couple who were then playing Jacqui McQueen and Brendan Brady on Hollyoaks.

Filmography

References

External links 
 

1993 births
English male soap opera actors
English male child actors
Living people
People educated at Bacup and Rawtenstall Grammar School